The B Sixth Avenue Express is a rapid transit service in the B Division of the New York City Subway. Its route emblem, or "bullet", is colored , since it uses the IND Sixth Avenue Line in Manhattan.

The B operates only on weekdays between Brighton Beach in Brooklyn and 145th Street in Harlem, Manhattan, making express stops in Brooklyn along the BMT Brighton Line and in Manhattan along Sixth Avenue, and makes local stops along Central Park West. During rush hours, the B is extended beyond 145th Street to and from Bedford Park Boulevard in the Bronx, making local stops along Grand Concourse.

Prior to  the B ran almost exclusively in Manhattan, as the BB, from 168th Street in Washington Heights during rush hours to 34th Street–Herald Square in Midtown Manhattan. Upon the opening of the Chrystie Street Connection, the B started running via the BMT West End Line (local) and BMT Fourth Avenue Line (express) in Brooklyn. A short-lived  B service ran via the BMT Broadway Line in Manhattan and the BMT West End Line in Brooklyn from 1986 to 1988 due to Manhattan Bridge renovation, while  B service traveled the pre-1967 route between 168th and 34th Streets. After 1989, the B north of 47th–50th Streets–Rockefeller Center used the IND Eighth Avenue Line to 168th Street on weekdays, and the IND 63rd Street Line on evenings and weekends. Late night service ran as a shuttle on the West End Line. Weekday service was rerouted to the Concourse Line in 1998, while off-peak service along 63rd Street ceased in 2000. The B started using the Brighton Line in 2004 after work on the north side of the Manhattan Bridge was completed.

History 

The designation B was originally intended for express trains originating from the Washington Heights neighborhood of Manhattan and operating in Midtown Manhattan on the IND Sixth Avenue Line. However, the original B service, beginning with the opening of the Sixth Avenue Line on December 15, 1940, ran as a rush-hour only local service between 168th Street–Washington Heights and 34th Street–Herald Square. This service was designated BB, conforming with the Independent Subway System (IND) convention using double letters to indicate local services.

Chrystie Street Connection 

The Chrystie Street Connection and the express tracks of the Sixth Avenue Line opened on November 26, 1967, radically changing service. BB trains were combined with the former  service, which ran on the BMT West End Line in Brooklyn and the BMT Broadway Line in Manhattan. This created a through service from 168th Street to Coney Island–Stillwell Avenue via the Sixth Avenue Line express tracks and the Manhattan Bridge. During middays, service to and from Brooklyn terminated at West 4th Street. During late night hours and Sundays when B service did not operate, TT shuttles continued to operate on the West End Line. On July 1, 1968, the B was rerouted to terminate at 57th Street in Midtown Manhattan during middays and evenings, extending to 168th Street only during rush hours. The West End Line shuttles were also made part of the B route.

On June 1, 1976, the New York City Transit Authority (NYCTA) announced changes in subway service that were expected to save $12.6 million annually and were the third phase of the agency's plan to realign subway service to better reflect ridership patterns and reduced ridership. As part of the changes, which took effect on August 30, 1976, B service began running between 57th Street and Coney Island during all times, replacing K service, and alternate B trains commenced operating between 168th Street and Coney Island during rush hours. On December 14, 1976, the NYCTA announced severe cuts in bus and subway service in order to cut its budget by $30 million over the following 18 months in order to achieve a balanced budget, at the request of the Emergency Financial Control Board. As part of the cuts, late night B service was cut back to running as a shuttle between 36th Street and Coney Island via the West End Line. This change took effect on August 27, 1977. Initially, the 57th Street station was to be closed during late nights. However, a B shuttle also operated during late nights, running between 47th–50th Streets–Rockefeller Center and 57th Street.

The NYCTA approved four changes in subway service on April 27, 1981, including an increase in B service. The changes were made as part of the $1 million, two-year Rapid Transit Sufficiency Study, and were expected to take place as early as 1982, following public hearings and approval by the Metropolitan Transportation Authority (MTA) board. As part of the changes, midday B service was going to be increased, replacing AA service. B service on the West End Line and Fourth Avenue Line express was to be supplemented by a new rush hour T train, running between Bay Parkway and Chambers Street on the Nassau Street Line.

On June 1, 1983, the NYCTA proposed changes to increase service along Sixth Avenue and better connecting the line to the Bronx and Queens. As part of the changes, B train service would run to 168th Street at all times, with service to 57th Street during non-rush hours replaced by a new H train running between 57th Street and World Trade Center. With the extension of B service to 168th Street, AA service would be eliminated. The changes would have gone into effect in spring or summer 1984, pending approval by the MTA board.

Manhattan Bridge reconstruction (1986 to 2004)

1980s 
The reconstruction of the Manhattan Bridge between 1986 and 2004 affected B service as the bridge's north side tracks, which led to the Sixth Avenue Line, were closed multiple times. These closures severed the connection between the northern and southern portions of the route. B service was split into two different services starting on April 26, 1986, with an expected completion date of October 26, 1986. The closure of the bridge's north side tracks caused the return of pre-November 1967 service patterns, before the opening of the Chrystie Street Connection: The orange B duplicated the former BB service, and the yellow B imitated the old  service. The northern B service ran via Sixth Avenue, using an orange bullet, between 34th Street-Herald Square and 168th Street during rush hours only. The southern B service ran via the bridge and BMT Broadway Line, using a yellow bullet. It ran from Coney Island-Stillwell Avenue and terminated at Astoria–Ditmars Boulevard rush hours, Queensboro Plaza middays, evenings and weekends and 36th Street late nights as a shuttle. Service to 57th Street and Grand Street was replaced by an S shuttle running between these two points, running via the Sixth Avenue local. On May 24, 1987, evening and weekend Broadway Line B service was cut back from Queensboro Plaza to 57th Street–Seventh Avenue.

Through B service on the Sixth Avenue Line resumed December 11, 1988, when the Manhattan Bridge's north side tracks reopened. Due to increased demand for Sixth Avenue service along Central Park West, B trains were extended local to 168th Street on middays and evenings, partially replacing the discontinued K service. During late nights, the B continued to operate as the West End Shuttle from 36th Street to Coney Island. B service operated to 57th Street during weekends and N service was increased to replace B service to Ditmars Boulevard. In May 1989, Sunday afternoon service was increased to run every 10 minutes instead of every 12 minutes.

With the opening of the IND 63rd Street Line on October 29, 1989, B service was extended from 57th Street to 21st Street–Queensbridge on weekends. In addition, the span of through-service on weekends between Brooklyn and Manhattan was increased from 17 to 19 hours. The last Brooklyn-bound through train was the train leaving 57th Street at 1:12 a.m. as opposed to the one leaving at 12:11 a.m., and the last Manhattan-bound through-train was the train leaving Coney Island at 5:01 a.m. Saturdays or 5:21 a.m. Sundays, not the 5:42 a.m. Saturday train or the 6:21 a.m. Sunday train. Weekday service was also slightly modified, with Stillwell Avenue-bound trains running local along Fourth Avenue in Brooklyn until 8 a.m. instead of 7 a.m.

On September 30, 1990, evening service was rerouted to 21st Street–Queensbridge to replace Q service with A service running local between 145th and 168th Streets in its place. B trains stopped operating between 47th–50th Streets–Rockefeller Center and 168th Street between 8:15 p.m. and 6:45 a.m., saving the NYCTA $1.35 million annually. Also on this date, because N service resumed running via the Manhattan Bridge, B trains began skipping DeKalb Avenue.

1990s
The north side of the Manhattan Bridge closed on middays and weekends from April 30, 1995 until November 12, 1995, during which B trains ran only between Pacific Street and Coney Island–Stillwell Avenue, running local on the BMT West End Line and express on the BMT Fourth Avenue Line.

From February 22, 1998 to May 22, 1999, B service was cut to 57th Street on evenings and weekends due to track and tunnel reconstruction of the IND 63rd Street Line. Service on that line was replaced by a shuttle to the BMT Broadway Line which ran every 20 minutes. The 57th Street station was closed from 12:30 to 6 a.m. daily during the project. The project had initially been slated to be completed in fall 1999, but normal service resumed in May 1999, ahead of schedule.

The B and the  switched northern terminals on March 1, 1998, ending the connection between the B and Washington Heights. The B was routed onto the IND Concourse Line to Bedford Park Boulevard during rush hours. Midday service terminated at 145th Street. The change was made to reduce crowding on the C and to reduce passenger confusion about the C's route.

2000s
On November 5, 2000, B service was taken off of the IND 63rd Street Line for signal and track work. It ran along Central Park West to 145th Street (terminating at Bedford Park Boulevard during rush hours) at all times except late nights.

On July 22, 2001, the Manhattan Bridge's north side tracks closed and B service over the Manhattan Bridge was split into two services once again, similar to the 1986 changes. B service ran weekdays only, from 34th Street to Bedford Park Boulevard during rush hours and from 34th Street to 145th Street during middays and evenings.

The Manhattan Bridge was fully reopened to subway service on February 22, 2004. B trains were once again extended through Grand Street station and over the bridge's north tracks into Brooklyn. Now service operated between Brighton Beach and Bedford Park Boulevard during rush hours and Brighton Beach and 145th Street on weekday middays and evenings. The B now served the BMT Brighton Line in Brooklyn as the express (replacing the <Q>), instead of the West End Line which it had served in some form since 1967, to combine two weekday-only services. Instead, the D train served the West End Line, running express on the 4th Av Line in Brooklyn.

2004 to present
From September 14, 2009 to October 3, 2011, B trains ran local in Brooklyn due to station renovations on the Brighton Line.

In July 2019, the MTA introduced a proposal to end late evening service. Instead, B service would end around 9:30 PM, which it previously did prior to July 2008. In their proposal, the MTA noted that service often ended early on weeknights to accommodate planned work.

From March 2020 to June 8, 2020, the B was temporarily suspended due to lack of ridership and train crew availability caused by the COVID-19 pandemic. From December 30, 2021, to January 19, 2022, B service was again suspended due to a shortage of crew members exacerbated by the COVID-19 pandemic.

Route

Service pattern 
The following table shows the lines used by the B, with shaded boxes indicating the route at the specified times:

Stations 

For a more detailed station listing, see the articles on the lines listed above.

References

External links 

 MTA NYC Transit – B Sixth Avenue Express
 
 

New York City Subway services